"Rain on Your Parade" is a song by Welsh singer Duffy from the deluxe version of her debut studio album Rockferry (2008). It was released as the lead and only single from the deluxe album worldwide on 9 November 2008. The song was written by Duffy and Rockferry collaborator Steve Booker and produced by Booker. It is an up-tempo pop song in which Duffy uses an idiom for ruining her lover and their intentions. The song marked a departure from the down-tempo soul and balladry of the original version of Rockferry, incorporating elements of R&B and soul. It received positive reviews from critics, with many complimenting Duffy's vocals. Musically, the song bears a striking resemblance to James Bond songs, making notable use of strings. It was called a "big, retro-sounding pop-soul number".

Commercially, the song was a moderate chart success, peaking at number 15 on the UK Singles Chart, and reaching the top ten on the Italian FIMI Singles Chart. The song's accompanying music video featured Duffy in a style never previously connected with her, with a complicated dance routine and violin players. Duffy performed "Rain on Your Parade" on several television shows including The Royal Variety Show and New Year Live, whilst it has since featured on several film soundtracks and compilation albums. The song was released alongside three B-sides, one of which, titled "Smoke Without Fire" was written for the film An Education.

Release and background

Promotion
Duffy performed the song on various TV shows and broadcast festivals in order to promote the release. Shows included The Royal Variety Show, New Year Live and various others. The song as well as "I'm Scared" featured in the 2009 film, Bride Wars. She also performed the track on the BBC Comic Relief charity appeal. The song features a prevalent string section that plays the main riff on the track.
The song is used to promote the season 5 of Desperate Housewives in Australia.

Reception

Critical
The song was well received by critics with many picking up on the "James Bond" feel to the track. Digital Spy gave the single four out of five stars and predicted that it would be another "smash" for Duffy with its "distinctive" vocals. Music.Com described it as a "big, retro-sounding pop-soul number".

Chart performance
On the UK Singles Chart, it debuted at number twenty two on digital download sales, before rising to number fifteen, giving Duffy her third top twenty hit, and then falling to number twenty two again. After leaving the top forty the song re-entered the chart, at number thirty seven then went up 5 places to number thirty two, where it stayed for two weeks. The following week, it left the top forty again.

The song was also Duffy's second top ten hit on the Italian Singles Chart where it entered the chart at number ten giving Rain on Your Parade its first top ten chart placing in Europe. The song was also Duffy's fourth top forty hit on many European single charts.

Music video
The music video was shot in London, with director Sophie Muller and premiered via YouTube on 17 October 2008. The video has Duffy in a black background which changes to white, it also has people playing violins, and has male dancers around her whilst she stands in the centre of the room. Inspiration for the video came from the Judy Garland number "Get Happy" in the 1950 film Summer Stock. The video was released onto UK iTunes on 14 October.

Track listing

CD single
"Rain on Your Parade"
"Syrup & Honey" 

7" vinyl
"Rain on Your Parade"
"Smoke Without Fire" 

European enhanced maxi-single
"Rain on Your Parade"
"Syrup & Honey"
"Smoke Without Fire"
"Big Flame" 
"Rain on Your Parade" 

European CD single
"Rain on Your Parade"
"Smoke Without Fire"

Digital download
"Rain on Your Parade"

Australian digital download
"Rain on Your Parade"
"Syrup & Honey"
"Smoke Without Fire"
"Big Flame" 

Music video download
"Rain on Your Parade"

Release history

Charts

End of year

References

External links

2008 singles
Duffy (singer) albums
Duffy (singer) songs
Music videos directed by Sophie Muller
Songs written by Steve Booker (producer)
2008 songs
A&M Records singles
Songs about weather